Esther Lee Jones (born , date of death unknown), known by her stage names "Baby Esther", "Little Esther", and other similar variations, was an American singer and child entertainer of the late 1920s, known for interpreting popular songs with a "mixture of seriousness and childish mischief". After gaining attention in her hometown of Chicago, she became an international celebrity before leaving the public spotlight as a teenager.

In 1932, when singer Helen Kane sued Fleischer Studios, claiming that they had appropriated her persona for the voice of the cartoon character Betty Boop, the studios defended themselves by arguing that Kane's style of singing—characterized by her baby voice and use of the phrase "boop-boop-a-doop"—was not her own invention. Theatrical manager Lou Bolton testified during the Kane v. Fleischer trial that Kane saw Baby Esther's cabaret act in 1928, in which Esther used interpolated words such as "boo-boo-boo" and "doo-doo-doo".  An early test sound film of Baby Esther's performance was used as evidence. Other evidence introduced at the trial included a recording by the Duncan Sisters and testimony from performers such as Bonnie Poe, Margie Hines, and Little Ann Little, who testified that she had been singing in a baby voice and using interpolations such as "bo-de-o-do" for several years. The court ruled against Kane.

Overview 
"Baby" Esther Lee Jones, originally billed as Little, Li'l or Lil' Esther, was a child entertainer who lived in Chicago, Illinois. She was initially managed by her parents, Gertrude and William Jones. Esther was a trained scat singer, dancer and acrobat who performed regularly at nightclubs in Harlem and all over the United States in the 1920s. In her act, "Baby Esther" danced, made funny faces, rolled her eyes, and—most famously—interpolated nonsense phrases such as "Boo-Boo-Boo", "Wha-Da-Da", and "Doo-Doo-Doo".

By 1924, she was being managed by Lou Bolton. According to Bolton, Esther began using nonsense syllables in her singing between 1926 and her arrival in New York in 1928. In 1928, Tony Shayne, Jones' New York booking agent, also served as booking agent for Helen Kane. In the later Kane v. Fleischer court case, Bolton claimed that Kane first saw Esther perform in 1928, at which time Kane had a ringside seat with Shayne at the Everglades Club on Broadway.

While touring Europe in 1930, Esther had already been honored, along with Josephine Hall, as representatives of both African-Americans and the United States of America.

Career 
Baby Esther lived in the "colored" neighborhood of Chicago with her mother and father. Esther's career began in the 1920s when she won first prize at a Charleston contest in Chicago at the age of six. Russian-American theatrical manager Lou Bolton saw her performance and took her on, with her first performance purportedly being in a Chicago revue, Opera Versus Charleston. Bolton went on to arrange engagements for Esther in Chicago, New York, Detroit, Toronto and other cities, after which he brought her to Europe. Esther Jones was rarely called Baby Esther while performing, most commonly going by the names "Li'l Esther" and "Little Esther." Originally she was billed "Farina's Kid Sister," but was later known as the "Miniature Florence Mills", as Esther had started her career impersonating Florence Mills. Florence Mills was noted for her "light, bright" voice and her use of wordless vocalizations such as "too-ty-tooty-too".

The name "Farina's Kid Sister" derived from Allen "Farina" Hoskins, another African-American child star of the period. Apart from his ongoing role in Our Gang comedies, Hoskins was an expert Charleston dancer, performing along with his sister "Baby Jane." Lou Bolton, Esther's first manager, used Hoskins' fame to promote Esther in the early years of her career; the name formulation of Little (or Lil'/Li'l) Esther mimicked Hoskins' "Little Farina," a frequently-used nickname. While touring Spain, Esther was referenced as a member of "La Pandilla," the Spanish name for the Our Gang kids (taken from their alternate series name of "Hal Roach's Rascals"); at least once, she was specifically tagged as the performer of Farina, due to her past imitations of him.

1928 
Esther performed briefly at a nightclub called the Everglades Club, where she would do imitations of Florence Mills, late at night. In June, Esther's father William Jones and manager Lou Bolton were charged for having a minor perform on stage; one write-up of the incident suggested that William Jones was not Esther's birth parent.

In late 1928 Esther was signed for a talking short by Movietone, booked through William Morris for MGM. While the short was later listed variously as being in production or completed, it has not surfaced as of 2020.

Harrison G. Smith, a business associate of Bolden Smith of New York, furnished Esther with several songs: "The Turtle Walk," "My Little Dixie Home," "I've Got the Blues for Dixieland," and "I Need a Man (Around My House)."

1929 
Esther toured Europe in 1929, when her age was variously reported as seven or ten. An article in The Chicago Defender described her as the highest-paid child artist in the world.
While touring Europe she delighted audiences including royalty. In Spain she played for King Alphonso and Queen Victoria Eugenie. In Sweden King Gustave and the Queen came to the theater especially to see her. In France, Germany, and other countries, Esther also gave private performances for the nobility and high society.

Esther's travels around Europe were not entirely without fits and starts. After a dispute, Bolton was fired as the Jones family's manager and returned to the United States; Bolton blamed an Afro-French interpreter, cited in Variety as "Jacques Garnier," for the fracas; at first, Esther's return to the United States was announced. But Sidney Garner—evidently the same man first cited as "Jacques"—took over as the Joneses' manager forthwith, and the family stayed in Europe.

Esther Jones first performed in France at the Moulin Rouge. In Paris, Esther was known as the "Miniature Josephine Baker." Vu, a leading illustrated weekly, devoted the entire front cover to her picture and a full page in the interior. Esther was described as singing, dancing, doing the splits and generally carrying on to the great delight of her audiences, and was dubbed as being "too cute for words".

The London Sunday People in its review of Paris plays said of Esther: "Thousands flock no longer to the Moulin Rouge to see Mistinguett herself or the clever American ballet girls, or the beautiful women of the chorus, but to applaud a little mite, 10-year-old, who has won fame and wealth within the space of a few weeks. We are living in an age of speed but this amazing little child has broken every record of sudden theatrical success."

In Stockholm, Sweden in August, Esther was famously refused service at an American restaurant run by Branda Tomton, an immigrant from the United States. Swedish dignitaries and officials around the country spoke up in support of Esther and objected to Tomton's discrimination, railing against American "Jim Crowism" in Sweden, forcing the restaurant to close.

1930–1934 
Esther continued her success in South America. In Rio de Janeiro, Buenos Aires, São Paulo, and Montevideo she proved to be a sensation. In Rio de Janeiro, American Ambassador Morgan came to see her play and after her performance came backstage to congratulate her. He praised her ability to sing in different languages and invited her to perform for him at the American embassy. Accompanying Esther was Gordon Stretton, who was known as the Prince of Wales' favorite jazz entertainer. In the course of the evening, the president of Brazil expressed to Sidney Garner his great pleasure at seeing such capable black American artists in Brazil.

Esther was interviewed in Rio de Janeiro by press who wanted to know how she had avoided the racists who lynched and burned black people in Texas and Alabama. Esther replied that she had so far escaped their wrath by staying out of the South.

When Esther returned to the United States she purportedly continued touring and danced for Cab Calloway and his Orchestra as one of his Sepia Dancers at his club in New York. In 1934, Esther, billed as "The Sepia Dancing Doll", appeared with Helena Justa's Harlem Maniacs revue.

In July 1934, Esther performed in Philadelphia at a midnight benefit performance for the NAACP, along with numerous other African-American stars. The Baltimore Afro-American commented that "Little Esther... had a bit too much art and finesse, born of her extensive travel and contacts, not to mention expert tutelage, for her to bring... spontaneous applause... But she had charm and grace—and—and—form! [Her] acrobatic dance number was very good." Esther made another Philadelphia appearance in September at a benefit for the Douglass Hospital, hosted by the famed dancer Bill "Bojangles" Robinson. Notably, Robinson also taught Helena Justa and Florence Mills.

Esther has been verified as giving routine performances as late as September 1934, but her later activities are unknown. In 1934, she may have been 12 or 13 years old, as her age was reported as seven in June 1928 and in March 1929; or she may have been 15 or 16, as other articles from 1929 describe Esther as 10 years old; and an article during the week of August 22, 1931, seems to say that she was 12 then.

Kane v. Fleischer 
In 1930, Fleischer Studios animator Grim Natwick introduced a caricature of Helen Kane—a singer known since 1923 for her baby voice and for replacing lyrics with noises, and later for her signature phrase "boop-oop-a-doop"—in the form of an anthropomorphic singing dog with droopy ears and a squeaky singing voice, in the Talkartoons cartoon Dizzy Dishes. "Betty Boop", as the character was later dubbed, soon became popular and the star of her own cartoons. In 1932, Betty Boop was changed into a human, the long dog ears becoming hoop earrings.

In May 1932, Kane  filed a $250,000 lawsuit against Max Fleischer and Paramount Publix Corporation, for "exploiting her image", charging unfair competition and wrongful appropriation in the Betty Boop cartoons, contending that Betty Boop's "boop-oop-a-doop" style constituted a "deliberate caricature" that gave her "unfair competition".

The trial opened that year in the New York State Supreme Court, with Kane and Betty Boop films being viewed only by the judge. No jury was called. Vocal performers Margie Hines, Little Ann Little, Kate Wright, Bonnie Poe, and most notably Mae Questel were all summoned to testify.

Little Ann Little told the court how the "boop-oop-a-doop" phrase had started out as "ba-da inde-do", which developed into "bo do-de-o-do" and finally to "boop-oop-a-doop". Helen Kane's counsel asked Little, who spoke throughout the trial in a Betty Boop voice, "Oh, do you speak like that way at home?" Little responded to the court, "Yes, indeedy!"

Defense uses Baby Esther 
Testimony was given that Kane adopted her singing style after watching Baby Esther perform in a New York nightclub in April 1928. Esther's first manager, Lou Bolton, testified for the defense stating that in 1925, he coached a "young negro child" named Esther, teaching her how to interpolate her songs with scat lyrics such as "boo-did-do-doo" and "whad-da-da-da". Jones' manager testified that Kane had seen her act at the Everglades Restaurant in April 1928, before Kane opened her act at the New York Paramount Theatre. Kane had already testified that her first use of the phrase "boop-boop-a-doop" was during her engagement at the Paramount Theatre. Under cross-examination Bolton said that he had met with Kane at the club after Esther's performance, but could not say when she had walked in. Bolton also stated that Fleischer's lawyers had paid him $200 to come to New York. Bolton told the court that he had no idea where Esther was, and he thought that she was "probably still" in Paris. In fact, in May 1934 she was performing in Louisville. Esther herself did not testify at the trial.

After a two-year legal struggle, Max Fleischer located a sound film made in 1928 of her performing, which was introduced as evidence.  In the film she sings three songs that had earlier been popularized by Helen Kane – "Don't Be Like That", "Is There Anything Wrong with That?"" and "Wa-da-da" – which writer Mark Langer says "was hardly proof that Helen Kane derived her singing style from Baby Esther". According to jazz historian Robert O'Meally, this evidence might have been fabricated by the Fleischers to discredit Kane, whom they later admitted was their model for Betty Boop. O'Meally also questioned if there was some sort of deal between Fleischer Studios and Bolton, and questioned if Esther was ever paid for her presumed loss of revenue.
Judge Edward J. McGoldrick ruled that "the vocables 'boop-boop-a-doop' and similar sounds had been used by other performers prior to the plaintiff" and that "the plaintiff has failed to sustain either cause of action by proof of sufficient probative force." In his opinion, based on the totality of the evidence presented in the trial, the "baby" technique of singing did not originate with Kane.

Legacy 
Baby Esther is most associated today with her connection with the Kane v. Fleischer lawsuit. The film of Jones has been credited with convincing the judge in the case that Helen Kane had copied Baby Esther. Film scholar Mark Langer disputes this interpretation, which he says has become "conventional wisdom".

No confirmed recordings of Jones are known to exist.

Misconceptions 

Baby Esther shares her original name and original stage name with Little Esther Phillips, who was also known as Esther Mae Jones. Both singers used the names "Little Esther" and "Li'l Esther", but Esther Phillips was of a later generation, born in 1935.

Photos of the model Olya Gussy costumed as Betty Boop, taken by Russian-based studio Retro Atelier in 2008, are regularly misidentified as Esther Jones.

An older photo often purported to show Jones went viral when it was distributed by the official Betty Boop Checks website. The image was actually a James Van Der Zee photo of an unidentified woman.

Admission of mistake 
In 2021, a 2015 article by PBS, which had been used as "confirmation" of the "Baby Esther was the original Betty Boop" story by many people, was removed from the PBS website. PBS retracted the story, admitted that the "Baby Esther" portion of the article was never true, and apologized for spreading misinformation.

See also 
List of African-American actors
List of child actors

References 

American child singers
American jazz singers
Year of death unknown
Year of birth uncertain